O Môn Rômzaner Oi Rozar Sheshe Elo Khushir Eid is the most notable Bengali Eid-ul-Fitr song, written by Kazi Nazrul Islam, the national poet of Bangladesh. It is a very common tune heard in Bengali Muslim households around the world. The song was written and composed at the request of Nazrul's disciple, Abbasuddin Ahmed in 1931. It has been covered by many artists around the world. The song is written on the end of the period of fasting and the Islamic holiday of Eid-ul-Fitr. This was regarded by his contemporaries as a significant achievement, as Bengali Muslims had been strongly averse to devotional music.

Bengali lyrics, romanization and English translation 
Lyrics and romanization:

Translation:

First recording
4 days after Nazrul wrote the poem, Abbasuddin Ahmed recorded it with his voice. Two months after, it was published on Eid day by The Gramophone Company. The song was set to the Pilu as its raga and keherwa for its tala (rhythm).

References

Bangladeshi songs
Songs written by Kazi Nazrul Islam
Bengali-language songs
Bengali-language poems
1931 poems
Ramadan
Eid (Islam)